Harrington Street Historic District is a national historic district located at Newberry, Newberry County, South Carolina.  The district encompasses 11 contributing buildings in Newberry.  The district includes residences dating from about 1870 to 1930.  They include Victorian raised cottages, a Neoclassical style mansion, and shotgun and bungalow vernacular styles.

It was listed on the National Register of Historic Places in 1980.

References 

Historic districts on the National Register of Historic Places in South Carolina
Neoclassical architecture in South Carolina
Victorian architecture in South Carolina
Historic districts in Newberry County, South Carolina
National Register of Historic Places in Newberry County, South Carolina
Newberry, South Carolina